Denise Rousseau (born 20 October 1951) is a professor at Carnegie Mellon University. She holds an H.J. Heinz III Chair in Organizational Behavior and Public Policy, Heinz College and jointly Tepper School of Business.

In 2007, she founded the Evidence-Based Management Collaborative to promote the development and dissemination of Evidence-based Management teaching and practice. Operating as the Center for Evidence-Based Management (Eric Barends, managing director), this Collaborative helps educators and practitioners make better use of evidence from science, data, stakeholders and experience in organizational decisions.  Rousseau serves as CEBMa's Academic Chair. Barends and Rousseau are co-convenors of the Business and Management Group of the Campbell Library of Systematic Reviews.

Previously, Rousseau worked on the faculties of the University of Michigan in Psychology and Institute for Social Research, Naval Postgraduate School at Monterey, and Kellogg School of Management at Northwestern University. Rousseau also has held visiting appointments at Nanyang Technological University, Singapore; Leeds University, UK,  Dublin City University, Ireland, and the University of New South Wales, Australia.

Education
She is a Fellow of the American Psychological Association, Society of Industrial-Organizational Psychology, Academy of Management, and British Academy of Management and an Academician of the Academy of Social Sciences.

She received an A.A. degree from Santa Rosa Junior College and undergraduate degrees with honors in Psychology and Anthropology from the University of California at Berkeley. She obtained her Ph.D. in psychology at the University of California at Berkeley and holds several honorary doctorates.

Rousseau's influences include Herb Simon and Stephen Laner.

Former Students include: Karl Aquino, Eric Barends, Guillermo Dabos, Violet Ho, Lai Lei, Laurie Levesque, Gerard Beenen, Ranga Ranganujam, and Sandra Robinson.

Work

Psychological contract theory
Rousseau developed the concept of a psychological contract in order to better specify how employers and employees understand the employment relationship. Psychological Contract Theory (PCT) also provides a basis for developing shared understandings in employment. It also addresses how to more effectively change the nature and terms of psychological contracts.

PCT recognized the existence of cognitive schema or mental models that employees and employers use in interacting with each other. The psychological contract is a system of beliefs an individual holds regarding an exchange arrangement with another (e.g., employment, customer/supplier relationship, family tie or marriage). A fundamental feature of the psychological contract is that like cognitive schemata generally, the contract, once established, is relatively resistant to change.

Psychological contracts when first formed tend to be incomplete since fully understanding or anticipating the demands in an ongoing employment arrangement may be unrealistic. Thus psychological contracts develop over time and often in ways that diverge between one party and another, or between multiple parties to the same arrangements.

Rousseau's 1995 book Psychological Contract in Organizations: Understanding Written and Unwritten Agreements won the George Terry Book Award for best book in management from the Academy of Management.

Idiosyncratic deals

Rousseau's research identified the often hidden but widespread phenomenon of idiosyncratic deals, whereby individual employees bargain for employment arrangements different from their peers. Early research on the psychological contract identified an anomaly, the repeated observation that people working for the same firm and same boss can have distinctly different psychological contracts. After considering alternative explanations, this observation lead to recognition that individual workers influence the terms of their own employment arrangements. These influences take the form of bargaining and self-initiated changes. Her 2005 book I-deals: Idiosyncratic Deals Employees Bargain for Themselves also won the George Terry Book Award for best book in management from the Academy of Management.

Several distinct features characterize i-deals and differentiate them from other forms of person-specific employment arrangements (e.g., cronyism or favoritism) as described below. The principal characteristics of i-deals are as follows:

Individually negotiated: An i-deal exists when an individual worker negotiates arrangements with an employer or prospective employer that differ from the corresponding arrangements of his or her coworkers.

Heterogeneous: At least some of the specific terms included in an i-deal are specially provided to that individual, differing from conditions created for other employees in similar positions or in the same work group.

Benefiting both employer and employee: I-deals serve the interests of both employers and employees. I-deals are distinct from other forms of person-specific employment arrangements in that the negotiation is based on the value of the individual worker to the employer (Rousseau, 2005). An organization attracts, motivates, and retains the services of a valued contributor at the same time he or she receives desired resources from that organization.

Varied in scope or proportion: The i-deals individual workers enjoy may vary in scope from a single idiosyncratic element in a larger standardized employment package to a complete, entirely idiosyncratic employment arrangement. For example, one worker with an i-deal might have distinctly more flexible hours than peers but otherwise share with them the same pay, job duties, and other conditions of employment. In contrast, another worker might have a more novel, customized arrangement in which almost all employment terms are specially negotiated, from pay and hours, to duties and title. Although both these individuals may be said to have idiosyncratic features in their employment arrangements, the relative proportion of idiosyncratic to standardized conditions is greater for the second worker.

A central feature of i-deals is that the employee has had a hand in creating or negotiating some aspect of his or her employment. Idiosyncratic arrangements can make jobs more valuable to workers, especially when they involve features not easily obtained from other employers. Special opportunities for training and development in particular lead employees to believe their psychological contract with the employer as relational.

Evidence-Based Management
EBM is the conscientious use of multiple sources of evidence in making organizational decisions. A critical issue in EBM is attention to the quality of the evidence and the integration of different kinds of evidence in understanding organizational problems and making decisions. Four sources of evidence are typically considered including scientific evidence obtained from peer-reviewed literature, organizational facts and context, stakeholder concerns and input obtained from those whose interests decisions affect, and practitioner experience and judgment.

A comprehensive treatment of EBM is available through Barends and Rousseau (2018), the Center for Evidence-Based Management website, and free on-line courses developed at Carnegie Mellon.

Current work 

 The role goals play in the dynamics of the psychological contract.(Rousseau, D.M., Hansen S. & Tomprou, M. A dynamic model of psychological contract phases. Journal of Organizational Behavior, 2018, 39,1081-1098)
 The sustained effects of idiosyncratic deals for individuals and organizations over time, including the role i-deals play in managerial decisions regarding workers and subsequent employee career outcomes
 Institution and community building in support of EBM in business schools and management practice. Efforts include supports for systematic reviews and rapid evidence assessment to provide research evidence to educators and practitioners

Past work 

Roberts, K. H., Hulin, C. L. & Rousseau, D. M. (1978) Developing an Interdisciplinary Science of Organizations.  San Francisco: Jossey-Bass
Psychological Contract in Organizations:  Understanding Written and Unwritten Agreements (1995).  Newbury Park, CA:  Sage
Arthur, M. B. & Rousseau, D. M. (1996).  Boundaryless Careers: A New Employment Principle for the New Organizational Era. New York: Oxford University Press 
Leana, C. & Rousseau, D. M. (2000).  Relational Wealth: Advantages of Stability in a Changing Economy.  New York:  Oxford University Press
Rousseau, D. M. & Schalk, R. (2000) Psychological Contract in Employment: Cross-national Perspectives.  Newbury Park:  Sage
I-deals: Idiosyncratic Deals Employees Bargain for Themselves. (2005) Armonk, NY:  M. E. Sharpe
Rousseau, D.M. Oxford Handbook of Evidence-based Management. New York: Oxford, 2012
Rousseau, D.M. DeRozario, P., Jardat, R. & Pesquex, Y. Contracts psychologiques et organisations: Comprendre les accords ecrit et non-ecrit. [French translation and extension of Psychological contracts in organizations: Understanding written and unwritten agreements.] Paris: Pearson, 2014
Bal, M.P., Kooji, D.T.A.M. & Rousseau, D.M. Aging workers and the employee-employer relationship, London: Springer, 2014
Bal, M.P. & Rousseau, D.M. Idiosyncratic deals between employees and organizations: Conceptual issues, applications, and the role of coworkers, London: Routledge, 2015
Evidence-Based Management: How to use evidence to make better organizational decisions (Kogan Page, 2018). Co-author: Eric Barends

Personal life 

Rousseau was married to fellow Carnegie Mellon professor and organizational psychologist Paul S. Goodman. They produced films together.

Awards 

 Phi Beta Kappa, University of California at Berkeley (1973)
Society of Organization Behavior (Elected 1979)
William J. Davis Memorial Award, Best Article, Educational Administration Quarterly (1982)
National Institute for Health Care Management Research Award (1994)
George R. Terry Award, Best Book in Management, Academy of Management (1996)
Shaw Chair, Nanyang Technical University, Singapore (2000)
Benedictine College, Recognition for Contribution to Organizational Development (2006)
Mentored Case Award, CASE Association Conference (with L. Levesque and V. Ho, 2006)
George R. Terry Award, Best Book in Management, Academy of Management (2006)
JMI Scholar, Western Academy of Management (2007) 
Distinguished Scholar, Managerial and Organizational Cognition Division, Academy of Management  (2006)
Douglas McGregor Memorial Award from NTL for Best Paper in Journal of Applied Behavior Science (2006)
Best Paper Award in Academy of Management Learning and Education (2008) 
Lifetime Achievement Award Organizational Behavior Division of Academy of Management (AOM) (2009)
 Distinguished Service Career Award, Academy of Management (2010)
 Honorary Doctorates from Athens University of Economics and Business (2013) and Tallinn University of Technology (2014)
 Lifetime Achievement Award, Israel Organizational Behavior Conference (2014)
 Elected, Academician, Academy of Social Sciences (UK - National Academy of Academics, Learned Societies and Practitioners in the Social Sciences (2014)
 Practice Impact Award, AOM Practice Theme Committee (2014)
 Mahoney AOM HR Division Mentoring Award (2015)
 Hughes Award for Career Scholarship, Academy of Management Careers Division (2016)
 Career Award for Lifetime Achievement Academy of Management Distinguished Scholarly Contributions to Management (2016)
 Michael Losey Career Award for Contributions to Scholarship and Practice, Society for Human Resource Management (2019)

External links 
 https://www.cmu.edu/tepper/faculty-and-research/faculty-by-area/profiles/rousseau-denise.html
 https://www.santarosa.edu/

References

Living people
Carnegie Mellon University faculty
American women psychologists
21st-century American psychologists
University of Michigan faculty
1951 births
20th-century American psychologists